is a railway station in Chikusa-ku, Nagoya, Aichi Prefecture, Japan.

It was opened on December 13, 2003.

Lines

 (Station number: M15)

Layout

Platforms

References

External links
 

Chikusa-ku, Nagoya
Railway stations in Japan opened in 2003